Microhexura is a genus of tiny North American spiders that was first described by C. R. Crosby & S. C. Bishop in 1925. It is the only genus in the family Microhexuridae. , it contained only two species, both found in the United States: M. idahoana and M. montivaga. M. montivaga occurs in the higher peaks of the Blue Ridge Mountains of North Carolina and Tennessee. M. idahoana occurs farther west, in the Cascades, the Blue Mountains, and the northern Rocky Mountains.

M. montivaga is considered endangered. M. idahoana is widespread in old growth from Mount Rainier southward.

References

External links
Microhexura at BugGuide

Mygalomorphae
Mygalomorphae genera